Vlad Iancu (born 3 January 1978), is a Romanian futsal player who plays for CS Informatica Timişoara and the Romanian national futsal team.

References

External links
UEFA profile

1978 births
Living people
Futsal goalkeepers
Romanian men's futsal players